The Devil's Needle is a 1916 silent film drama directed by Chester Withey and starring Norma Talmadge and Tully Marshall. It was produced by D. W. Griffith's Fine Arts Film Company and distributed by Triangle Films.

A 1923 rerelease print survives at the Library of Congress.

Cast
Norma Talmadge as Rene, His Model
Tully Marshall as David White
Marguerite Marsh as Wynne Mortimer
F. A. Turner as William Mortimer
Howard Gaye as Hugh Gordon
John Brennan as Fritz
Paul Le Blanc as Buck

References

External links
The Devil's Needle at IMDb.com

1916 films
Silent American drama films
American silent feature films
Films directed by Chester Withey
Triangle Film Corporation films
1916 drama films
American black-and-white films
1910s American films